is a 2003 Japanese animated tragicomedy adventure film written and directed by Satoshi Kon. The film stars live-action actors such as Toru Emori, Yoshiaki Umegaki, and Aya Okamoto as the lead voice actors.

Kon was inspired by the 1948 American film 3 Godfathers to make the film. Unlike Kon's other films, Tokyo Godfathers contains no fantasy elements nor does it explore themes of the lines between fiction and reality, instead being grounded more in realism. However, as is typical of Kon's work, the film includes devices that are not straightforward, and Kon himself called it a twisted sentimental story.

Tokyo Godfathers was released in Japan on November 8, 2003, and in North America on January 16, 2004.
It won the Excellence Award at the 2003 Japan Media Arts Festival and Best Animation Film at the 58th Mainichi Film Awards.

Plot
One Christmas Eve after watching a children's performance of the nativity scene, three homeless people—a middle-aged alcoholic man named Gin, a transgender woman named Hana, and a dependent teenage runaway girl named Miyuki—discover an abandoned newborn while searching through the garbage for presents. Deposited with the unnamed baby is a note asking the unknown finder to take good care of her and a key, leading to a bag containing clues to the parents' identity. The trio sets out to find the baby's parents. The baby is named Kiyoko by Hana, based on the Japanese translation of "Silent Night" literally meaning "pure child", as she is found on Christmas Eve. Outside a cemetery, the group encounters a high-ranking yakuza boss trapped under his car. The man happens to know the owner of the club where Kiyoko's mother used to work; his daughter is going to be marrying the club's owner that day. At the wedding reception, the groom tells them that the baby's mother is a former bar girl named Sachiko. He gives them Sachiko's address, but the party is interrupted when a maid, revealed to be a Latino hitman in disguise, attempts to shoot the bride's father. The hitman kidnaps Miyuki and baby Kiyoko while holding them hostage at gunpoint and takes them back to his home. There, Miyuki befriends the hitman's wife who happens to have a child of her own and they begin bonding (despite their language barrier). While looking through old photo albums, Miyuki tearfully confesses to fleeing her home after stabbing her controlling father Ishida when her beloved cat Angel went missing (believing that he had gotten rid of it).

Hana searches for Miyuki and Kiyoko while Gin takes care of an elderly homeless man who is dying in the street. After giving Gin a little red bag, the old man peacefully passes away. Some teenagers show up and beat up Gin and the dead old man's corpse. Meanwhile, Hana finds the girls and they go off to find a place to stay. They go to Angel Tower, a club where Hana had worked at before quitting her job for assaulting a rude and intoxicated customer years ago. Gin, who was rescued by another member of the club, is also there. While there, it's learned that Hana had become homeless when her lover Ken had died from mortally injuring himself after slipping on a bar of soap in the bathroom. The trio set out to find Sachiko's house, but they discover that it has been torn down. They are informed of the unhappy relationship between Sachiko and her husband, who is a gambling alcoholic. During this time, Miyuki sees a message from her father in the newspaper informing her that Angel has returned home. Realizing her mistake, Miyuki attempts to call her father, only to panic and hang up on him before she can say a word. The group rests at a store until they are told to leave by the clerk. Hana collapses, and is taken by Gin and Miyuki to the hospital. Once at the hospital, Gin finds his estranged daughter, who is also named Kiyoko, working as a nurse. Hana berates Gin in front of his daughter and storms out of the hospital, with Miyuki following behind with baby Kiyoko in hand. Hana and Miyuki find Sachiko about to jump off a bridge. Sachiko insists that her husband got rid of the baby without her knowledge, and Hana and Miyuki return the baby to her.

Gin finds Sachiko's husband, who confirms a TV report Gin saw earlier that Kiyoko was actually stolen by Sachiko from the hospital. They chase after Sachiko and Kiyoko. After an intense car chase, Miyuki chases Sachiko to the top of a building. Sachiko reveals she became pregnant in hopes it would bring her closer to her husband. When her baby was stillborn, she decided to kidnap Kiyoko from the hospital's nursery, thinking, in her grief, the baby was hers. As Sachiko is about to jump off the building intending to commit suicide with Kiyoko in her hands, her husband comes out of his apartment, located just across the street, and begs her to start over with him. Sachiko jumps off nevertheless, but Miyuki manages to catch her before she falls, but then Sachiko accidentally drops Kiyoko. Hana jumps off the building after Kiyoko, catching the baby and clinging to a banner on the side of the building. As the banner begins to give way, a gust of wind miraculously slows its descent, allowing Hana and the baby to land safely on the ground. Hana, Miyuki, and Gin are taken to the hospital. Miyuki hands Gin his cigarettes and drops the old man's small red bag on the floor, revealing a winning lottery ticket. Kiyoko's real parents want to ask the trio to become her godparents. When a police inspector introduces them to the trio, the inspector is revealed to be Miyuki's father.

Cast

Additional voices
Japanese: Akiko Kawase, Akiko Takeguchi, Atsuko Yuya, Bin Horikawa, Chiyako Shibahara, Eriko Kawasaki, Hidenari Umezu, Kazuaki Itou, Masao Harada, Mitsuru Ogata, Nobuyuki Furuta, Toshitaka Shimizu, Tsuguo Mogami, Yoshinori Sonobe, Yuuto Kazama

English (GKIDS): Crispin Freeman, David Manis, Erica Schroeder, Jaden Waldman, Jamieson Price, Jordan Cole, Kirk Thornton, Lexie Foley, Gloria Garayua, Marc Thompson, Michael Sinterniklaas, Orlando Rios, Philece Sampler

Production
During the production of Millennium Actress, a producer from Madhouse asked Kon if he had any plans for his next film. After completing the film, Kon took two months to write and submit a brief proposal, which was immediately accepted by Madhouse.

The original story and screenplay were written by director Satoshi Kon, and co-written by Keiko Nobumoto, known as the screenwriter of the TV drama series Hakusen Nagashi and the TV anime Cowboy Bebop, and the creator of the TV anime Wolf's Rain.
Kon had previously asked Nobumoto to write the script for Perfect Blue, but she was turned down at that time, citing her busy schedule.
The animation director was Kenichi Konishi, who had worked on My Neighbors the Yamadas while at Studio Ghibli, and the Studio director was Shogo Furuya.

While the previous two works focused on the progression of the story, this work prioritized the theatricality of the characters and their presence above all else in both the scenario and storyboarding.
Although the story and theatrics are quite comical in appearance, the film was created not to return to the old-fashioned manga interpretation, but to aim for a manga interpretation that lies ahead after going through real-oriented animation.

The film was produced in digital technology, and all of Kon's subsequent works are digital animation.

Themes
The motif of Tokyo Godfathers is "coincidence" and "family," and the rough plot is about "three main characters who are not related by blood but live together as if they were a real family, and through a miraculous coincidence triggered by a baby, each of them recovers the connection with their original family that they have lost.

Tokyo Godfathers does not adopt an overt "mixing of fiction and reality" motif, but a careful look reveals that the relationship between "fiction and reality" is conscious in this film as well.
What Kon was conscious of in his direction was "meaningful coincidence", in other words, to create a chain of miraculous events to move the story forward.
Kon writes in the press sheet, "This film is an attempt to restore in a healthy way the 'miracles and coincidences' that have been pushed into the other world by the weapons of scientific logic," and just as that sentence says, "meaningful coincidences" and "impossible events" happen one after another in Tokyo Godfathers .
In other words, the idea of this film is that the "fiction" of "miracles and coincidences" can be found in the seemingly real life of the homeless in Tokyo. The director's aim is to portray a series of events that could never happen in reality with a sense of reality and persuasiveness that makes it seem possible.

Kon said: "Homeless people, as the term implies, 'have no home,' but in this film, it is not just 'people who have lost their homes,' but also 'people who have lost their families,' and in that sense, this film is a story about recovering lost relationships with families." Kon chose homeless people as his protagonists because he had long been interested in the lives of homeless people. One of the triggers for Kon to come up with Tokyo Godfathers was the idea that they are born even in times of affluence, and at the same time, they are supported because the world is affluent, so they may be said to be kept alive by the city. The other idea was the idea of animism in the city, that even the buildings and alleys of the city may have a soul, and that the main characters step into the other world that overlaps the city. Based on a story in which three homeless people living like pseudo-families pick up a baby and try to return it to her parents, Kon imagined a story in which the trio enter a "different world" where strange coincidences occur in succession, and they recover their relationship with their families and society through their adventures, while another protagonist named "Tokyo" is watching over them. In fact, "landscapes that look like faces," in which the outdoor units of air conditioners and windows are used as eyes and mouths, are embedded in various cuts, which could be said to be the figures of the gods of the city staring at the main characters. These "faces" are not visible from the perspective of the characters, and only the audience can notice them. Kon has also created a fiction here. The film's background is a trick of overlapping two layers of information: "the city scenery = reality for the characters" and "the scenery with faces that only the audience can see = a kind of fiction", even though it is the same single picture.

The setting of the three main characters, who are not blood related, had the condition that they look like a family. It was not so much an exaggeration as a suggestion of a "new image of the family in the future," but simply a suggestion that Kon's idea of a family with this kind of relationship might be acceptable. Kon's idea was to suggest that it is necessary to find a way for each person to have their own family, rather than a standardized model of what a new family should look like. Kon said that he did not intend to portray homeless people as representatives of weakness and unhappiness, or as a hindrance to society, and that the three are symbols of everyone's weaknesses and regrets rather than real homeless people. He also said they are unhappy not because they are homeless, but because their lives have lost their former glow, and that happiness lies in the process of recovery, which is the story of this work itself.

Release
This movie was released in North America by Sony Pictures on December 29, 2003 in an unsuccessful attempt to get an Academy Award nomination for Best Animated Feature. The movie was released on sub-only DVD on April 13, 2004, and they planned to use DTS for the DVD, but was ultimately scrapped. Announced on December 19, 2019, international animation licensor, GKIDS, in partnership with the original US distributor Destination Films, released the movie on March 9, 2020 with a brand new 4K restoration and a new English dub.

Reception
The review aggregation website Rotten Tomatoes reported that 91% of critics have given the film a positive review based on 74 reviews, with an average rating of 7.1/10. The critics consensus states, "Beautiful and substantive, Tokyo Godfathers adds a moving – and somewhat unconventional – entry to the animated Christmas canon." On Metacritic, the film has a weighted average score of 73 out of 100 based on 25 critics, indicating "generally favorable reviews." Roger Ebert gave the film three stars out of four, calling it "harrowing and heartwarming."

Susan Napier points out that Tokyo Godfathers is part of a trend in anime and manga as depicting families in an increasingly dark fashion, showcasing the problems with traditional families, and attempts by people to construct a "pseudo-family" out of an increasingly fragmented and isolating modern Japanese society. It is put forth that despite the seeming criticisms of traditional families throughout the film, it ends with a more conservative feeling as everyone returns to their traditional/original families. Despite its seemingly traditional ending, the film offers a more radical version of family. Throughout the story these three homeless vagabonds unknowingly form a "pseudo-family" to protect themselves from the outside world and to overcome their personal demons.

See also
 Homelessness in Japan
 Japanese films of 2003
 List of Christmas films

References

External links
 
 
 
 
 

2003 anime films
2003 LGBT-related films
2003 films
Animated Christmas films
Anime with original screenplays
Films about trans women
Dentsu
Films about homelessness
Films directed by Satoshi Kon
Films set in Tokyo
Genco
Japanese Christmas films
Japanese LGBT-related films
Madhouse (company)
LGBT-related animated films
Sony Pictures Entertainment Japan films
Japanese adult animated films
Transgender-related films